Pablo Pérez Companc (born December 11, 1982) is an Argentine racing driver from Buenos Aires.

Pérez Companc started editing the Argentine version of Evo in 2012 and Octane in 2013.

His father is businessman Gregorio Pérez Companc. He is the younger brother of Ford World Rally Championship rally driver, Luís Pérez Companc.

Motorsport career 
He began his racing career in the Canadian Formula Ford 2000 in 2000. In 2001 and 2002 he drove in the Argentine Formula Renault Championship. From 2004 to 2005 Pérez competed in the Formula Three Sudamericana. In 2004 he drove for PropCar Racing and finished 13th in points and in 2005 he drove for Nasr-Castroneves Racing and captured his first win and finished 9th in points. The year 2006 saw him move to GT 2000, an Argentine sports car series, where he won all three races he contested.

He signed with Chip Ganassi Racing for 2007 in the Indy Pro Series. In his first race for the team at Homestead-Miami Speedway he made contact with Sean Guthrie's car on lap 47.  His car launched over Guthrie and into the catch fence where the footbox of his car was sheared off, resulting in what an observer termed as "gruesome" injuries to his feet and legs. He underwent extensive surgery on both legs below the knees. He was able to attend activities at Indy in May, 2007, albeit confined to a wheelchair. The following year he had recovered and returned to GT 2000 where he won two of the four races he contested. He followed that up with winning the 2009 championship, capturing victories in eight of the ten races. However, 2010 was less successful as he only won once and finished 11th in the championship. He continued to drive in GT 2000 in 2011. 

In 2017, Pérez Companc is competing in the Pirelli World Challenge with the Champ 1 Motorsports Mercedes-AMG GT3.

Car Collection 
Companc is a prolific collector of automobiles and founded the Florida-based Squadra Lupo Import to house his extensive collection. The collection houses a number of Group B cars, as well as supercars and muscle cars.

The collection includes:

 Pagani Zonda Revolucion, #3 of 5
 Pagani Huayra BC, nicknamed "Wild Minion"
 Liquid Carbon Fibre Ford GT
 Ford GT (2005)
 Lamborghini Gallardo Squadra Corse
 Lamborghini Huracán Super Trofeo Evo
 Porsche 911 GT2 RS
 Ford RS200
 BMW E30 M3
 Lancia Delta
 Shelby GT500
 Dodge Demon
 Alfa Romeo 155 V6 TI
 Peugeot 205 T16
 Renault 5 Turbo
 Subaru Impreza WRC ex Peter Solberg
 Aston Martin Vantage V12
 Mercedes 190 EVO II

References

Racing drivers from Buenos Aires
Argentine racing drivers
Indy Lights drivers
Formula 3 Sudamericana drivers
Formula Renault Argentina drivers
1982 births
Living people

Chip Ganassi Racing drivers